Caitlin Irene Simmons is a beauty queen from Tulsa, Oklahoma who competed in the Miss USA pageant in 2007.

Simmons won the Miss Oklahoma USA 2007 title in a state pageant held in Tulsa, Oklahoma.  This was her second attempt at the title, as she competed in the previous years event and placed as a semi-finalist.  She also competed in the Miss Oklahoma Teen USA 2004 pageant, and was awarded an Honourable Mention.

Simmons was crowned by outgoing titleholder Robyn Watkins of Norman.  Her sister titleholder is Paige Hill, Miss Oklahoma Teen USA 2007, of Oklahoma City.

Simmons represented Oklahoma in the nationally televised Miss USA 2007 pageant which was broadcast live from the Kodak Theatre in Hollywood, California on March 23, 2007.

External links
Miss Oklahoma USA official website
Miss USA official website

1985 births
Living people
People from Tulsa, Oklahoma
Miss USA 2007 delegates